The Brest Railway Museum or Brest Museum of Rail Equipment is the first outdoor railway museum in Belarus, located in Brest, opened in 2002.

Museum's collection consists of 56 units including
 Steam engines
 EU
 EM
 ER
 E
 FD20
 SO17
 Su
 L
 LV
 P36 "Victory"
 9P (tank-engine)
 TE (Europe made and converted to 1524mm gauge)
 2 Steam cranes
 PK-6
 PK-CUMZ
 Retro passenger cabs
 Diesel-electric engines
 Te1 (Freight)  
 Te3 (Freight)
 Te7 (Passenger version of Te3) 
 2Te109 (Freight)
 M62 (Freight-passenger)
 Tep60 (Passenger)
 ChME2 (Shunting)
 Tem15 (Shunting)
 Tem-2A (Shunting)
 Tu-2 (Narrow gauge freight-passenger)
 Diesel-hydraulic engine TGK-1 (Shunting)
 DMU DR1 (Head unit only)
 Rail bus AS1A (for inspection purposes)
 Snowplough SDPM
and others

References

 
 
Вандроўка ў Берасьцейскі чыгуначны музэй
Музей чыгуначнай тэхнікі

External links

 Official web page (Russian)

 

Museums in Brest Region
Buildings and structures in Brest, Belarus
Rail transport in Belarus
Museums established in 2002
Railway museums in Belarus
2002 establishments in Belarus